Glucan 1,3-alpha-glucosidase (exo-1,3-alpha-glucanase, glucosidase II, 1,3-alpha-D-glucan 3-glucohydrolase) is an enzyme with systematic name 3-alpha-D-glucan 3-glucohydrolase. This enzyme catalyses the following chemical reaction

 Hydrolysis of terminal (1->3)-alpha-D-glucosidic links in (1->3)-alpha-D-glucans

This enzyme does not act on nigeran although it has some activity against nigerose.

References

External links 
 

EC 3.2.1